A spherical roller thrust bearing is a rolling-element bearing of thrust type that permits rotation with low friction, and permits angular misalignment. The bearing is designed to take radial loads, and heavy axial loads in one direction. Typically these bearings support a rotating shaft in the bore of the shaft washer that may be misaligned in respect to the housing washer. The misalignment is possible due to the spherical internal shape of the house washer.

Construction
Spherical roller thrust bearings consist of a shaft washer (for radial bearings often called "inner ring"), a housing washer (for radial bearings often called "outer ring"), asymmetrical rollers and a cage. There are also bearing units available that can take axial loads in two directions.

History
The spherical roller thrust bearing was introduced by SKF in 1939. The design of the early bearings is similar to the design that is still in use in modern machines.

Designs

The internal design of the bearing is not standardised by ISO, so it varies between different manufacturers and different series. Some of the design parameters are:
 Roller shape and dimensions
 Flange design
 Non-rotational notches in house washer

The spherical roller thrust bearings have the highest load rating density of all thrust bearings.

Dimensions
External dimensions of spherical roller bearings are standardised by ISO in the standard ISO 104:2015.

Some common series of spherical roller bearings are:
 292
 293
 294

Materials
Bearing rings and rolling elements can be made of a number of different materials, but the most common is "chrome steel", a material with approximately 1.5% chrome content. Such "chrome steel" has been standardized by a number of authorities, and there are therefore a number of similar materials, such as: AISI 52100 (USA), 100CR6 (Germany), SUJ2 (Japan) and GCR15 (China).

Some common materials for bearing cages:
 Sheet steel (stamped or laser-cut)
 Brass (stamped or machined)
 Steel (machined)

The choice of material is mainly done by the manufacturing volume and method. For large-volume bearings, cages are often of stamped sheet-metal, whereas low volume series often have cages of machined brass or machined steel.

Manufacturers
Some manufacturers of spherical roller bearings are SKF, Schaeffler, Timken Company and NSK Ltd.

Applications
Spherical roller thrust bearings are used in industrial applications, where there are heavy axial loads, moderate speeds and possibly misalignment.
Some common application areas are:

 Gearboxes
 Pulp and paper processing equipment (notably refiners)
 Marine propulsion and offshore drilling
 Cranes and swing bridges
 Water turbines
 Extruders for injection molding

See also
 Bearing (mechanical)
 Rolling-element bearing
 Self-aligning ball bearing
 Spherical plain bearing
 Spherical roller bearing
 Tapered roller bearing
 Thrust bearing

References

Bearings (mechanical)
Rolling-element bearings
Mechanical engineering
Swedish inventions